Bodwell is a surname. Notable people with the name include:

 Albert E. Bodwell (1851–1926), American architect and designer
 Joseph R. Bodwell (1818–1887), American politician
 Jennie Ferris Bodwell Cave (1902–2001), American politician
 Ebenezer Vining Bodwell (1827–1889), Canadian businessman and politician

See also
 Bodwell (disambiguation)